Colneleate synthase (9-divinyl ether synthase, 9-DES, CYP74D, CYP74D1, CYP74 cytochrome P-450, DES1) is an enzyme with systematic name (8E)-9-((1E,3E)-nona-1,3-dien-1-yloxy)non-8-enoate synthase. This enzyme catalyses the following chemical reaction

 (9S,10E,12Z)-9-hydroperoxyoctadeca-10,12-dienoate 
 (8E)-9-[(1E,3Z)-nona-1,3-dien-1-yloxy]non-8-enoate + H2O

This enzyme is a heme-thiolate protein (P450).

References

External links 
 

EC 4.2.1